Rani Silautia is an Indian politician from the Bharatiya Janata Party and a member of the Rajasthan Legislative Assembly representing the Baseri Vidhan Sabha constituency of Rajasthan.

References

External links
List of Elected Candidates of Bharatiya Janata Party

Bharatiya Janata Party politicians from Rajasthan
1970 births
Living people